The Bosnia and Herzegovina women's national football team represents Bosnia and Herzegovina in international football and is controlled by the Football Association of Bosnia and Herzegovina.

They have never qualified for the World Cup or the European Championship. The team is currently coached by Samira Hurem and captained by veteran Mersiha Aščerić. Currently ranked 63rd by FIFA, the team plays their home games at the Koševo City Stadium in the city of Sarajevo, the country's capital.

Team image

Home stadium
The Bosnia and Herzegovina women's national football team plays their home matches on the Bilino Polje Stadium.

Results and fixtures

The following is a list of match results in the last 12 months, as well as any future matches that have been scheduled.Legend

2022

2023

Coaching staff
Current coaching staff

Manager history

 Samira Hurem (2011–)

Players
Current squad
The following players were called up for 2023 FIFA Women's World Cup qualifying games against Denmark and Russia on 21 and 26 October 2021.Caps and goals correct as of 11 June 2021 after the game against Bulgaria. 

Recent call ups
The following players have also been called up to the Bosnia and Herzegovina squad within the last twelve months.

Records*Active players in bold, statistics correct as of 2021.''

Most capped players

Top goalscorers

Competitive record

FIFA Women's World Cup

UEFA Women's Championship

See also
Sport in Bosnia and Herzegovina
Football in Bosnia and Herzegovina
Women's football in Bosnia and Herzegovina
Bosnia and Herzegovina women's national under-19 football team
Bosnia and Herzegovina women's national under-17 football team
Bosnia and Herzegovina men's national football team

References

External links
Official website
FIFA profile

 
European women's national association football teams
National team